is a railway station on the Kagoshima Main Line in Moji-ku, Kitakyushu, Japan, operated by the Kyushu Railway Company (JR Kyushu).

Lines
Mojikō Station is served by the Kagoshima Main Line. The station is located close to Kyushu Railway History Museum Station on the Mojikō Retro Scenic Line operated by Heichiku.

Station layout
The Neo-Renaissance style building was built in 1914.

The station has a "Midori no Madoguchi" staffed ticket counter.

History

The station opened on 1 April 1891.  With the privatization of Japanese National Railways (JNR) on 1 April 1987, the station came under the control of JR Kyushu.

From 29 September 2012, the 1914-vintage station building was temporarily closed for major renovations. It is scheduled to reopen in March 2018. It was reopened in 2019 and is one of the two railway stations designated as an Important Cultural Property.

Passenger statistics
In fiscal 2016, the station was used by an average of 5,164 passengers daily (boarding passengers only), and it ranked 37th among the busiest stations of JR Kyushu.

Surrounding area
Mojikō Station is the gateway to various tourist attractions and old buildings which have been preserved in the nearby streets under the name Mojikō Retro.

Gallery

See also
 List of railway stations in Japan

References

External links

 Mojiko Station information (JR Kyushu) 

Railway stations in Fukuoka Prefecture
Buildings and structures in Kitakyushu
Railway stations in Japan opened in 1891